Ronnie D. Peterson (born July 7, 1952) is an American Democratic politician who has served in the Michigan House of Representatives from the 54th district since 2017.  Ronnie is a former Washtenaw County Commissioner and Ypsilanti City Council Member.

References

1952 births
Living people
Democratic Party members of the Michigan House of Representatives
21st-century American politicians
People from Ypsilanti, Michigan
Michigan city council members
County commissioners in Michigan